Peter Browne (born 25 October 1987) was a professional rugby union player, having most recently played for Ulster Rugby, having left London Welsh at the end of the 2014–15 season.

He was previously at Harlequins and Newcastle Falcons.

Educated at Dean Close School, Cheltenham, Browne went on to become a theology student at Durham University. Browne made his first team debut for the Newcastle Falcons against London Wasps during the 2007/8 season.

Capped by England Students that same year, he can play at either back row (Number eight) and second row (Lock). He is also eligible to play for Ireland through his father, Rev. Leonard Browne who is the current Headmaster of Dean Close Preparatory School.

On Tuesday 16 October 2018, Pete Browne announced his retirement from professional rugby due to medical reasons involving multiple concussions.

References

External links
Harlequins Profile Page 
Newcastle Falcons Profile Page 

Living people
1987 births
People educated at Dean Close School
English rugby union players
Newcastle Falcons players
Harlequin F.C. players
London Welsh RFC players
Ulster Rugby players
Alumni of Durham University
Durham University RFC players
Rugby union players from Bristol
Rugby union flankers